Magnolia macclurei (syn. Michelia macclurei) is a species of flowering plant in the family Magnoliaceae, native to southern China, including Hainan, and northern Vietnam.

When Floyd Alonzo McClure first encountered this species in 1925, he recorded in his notebook that, "The fragrance of the flowers is the most intoxicating I ever breathed." In China it is harvested for its timber, and it is used as a street tree in a number of southern Chinese cities. In Florida it is planted as an ornamental and is available from commercial nurseries.

References

macclurei
Trees of China
Flora of South-Central China
Flora of Southeast China
Flora of Hainan
Flora of Vietnam
Plants described in 2000